Paul Holocher (born May 24, 1969 in Seattle, Washington ) is a former U.S. soccer midfielder who played in Austria and Major League Soccer. He also earned one caps with the U.S. national team in 1996.  He was the Academy Director for MLS club Houston Dynamo.

College
Holocher attended Santa Clara University where he played for future national team coach Steve Sampson from 1988 to 1991. In 1989, the Broncos were NCAA co-champions with the University of Virginia. In 1990, Holocher was a third team All-American and ended his four seasons with the Broncos as the team's all-time career scorer.

Professional
In 1991, Holocher turned professional with the San Francisco Bay Blackhawks of the American Professional Soccer League (APSL). In 1991, the Blackhawks won the APSL championship. In 1992, the Blackhawks went 8–8. The owner decided to take the team to a lower division and so in 1993 the renamed San Jose Hawks spent one year in the USISL. The San Jose Hawks won their division and went to the Sizzlin’ Six tournament where Holocher was named MVP. Despite this success the team folded at the end of 1993.

Holocher moved to Europe where he signed with Austrian First Division club Admira Wacker. However, after spending only the 1993–1994 season in Austria, Holocher was back in the U.S. with the Fort Lauderdale Strikers (APSL). The Strikers folded at the end of the season and Holocher moved back west to the Monterey Bay Jaguars (USISL) which played in Santa Clara, California. The Jaguars won their division and went to the Sizzlin’ Nine tournament.

In February 1996, the San Jose Clash of Major League Soccer (MLS) selected Holocher in the fifth round (forty-eighth overall) of the league's Inaugural Player Draft. In April 1996 Holcher injured his knee and did not play again until the post-season. He played in five more games and scored one goal for the Clash. Holocher began the 1997 season with the Clash, but they waived him on April 10, 1997. Holocher returned to the Jaguars, now known as the California Jaguars.

In 1998, the Chicago Fire of MLS picked Holocher in the second round (sixteenth overall) of the Supplemental Draft but did not sign him.

National team
In 1996, the national team players went on strike just prior to a game in Peru. Holocher was called into the U.S. national team for the game, a 4–1 loss to Peru on October 16, 1996. Holocher was a second-half substitute for Ted Eck at forward.

Coaching
In 1999, Holocher entered the coaching ranks both at the collegiate and the youth soccer levels. He founded the Catalyst Soccer Club that year and coached in the Premier Futbol Club of Santa Cruz County. In 1999, the University of California, Santa Cruz (UC Santa Cruz) also hired Holocher as its NCAA Division III men's soccer coach. In January 2006, Holocher left UC Santa Cruz to become the head coach at NCAA Division I Cal Poly San Luis Obispo. In his eight seasons at UC Santa Cruz, Holocher compiled a 109–24–8 record. He also took the Slugs to the 2004 Division III championship game where his team lost 4–0 to Messiah.
In 2004, Holocher was inducted into the Santa Clara University Athletic Hall of Fame.

Recently he was hired as a youth coach at the U-18 level for the San Jose Earthquakes, his former team. Source

He resigned from Cal Poly in August 2014.

He spent years working with the San Jose Earthquakes Academy for 3 years before joining the Houston Dynamo Academy in July 2018 as the Academy Director.

References

External links
 
 
 

1969 births
Living people
Cal Poly Mustangs men's soccer coaches
Santa Clara Broncos men's soccer players
American expatriate soccer players
United States men's international soccer players
American Professional Soccer League players
San Francisco Bay Blackhawks players
Fort Lauderdale Strikers (1988–1994) players
USISL players
San Jose Hawks players
California Jaguars players
San Jose Earthquakes players
American soccer coaches
Major League Soccer players
Soccer players from Seattle
American soccer players
Expatriate footballers in Austria
Chicago Fire FC draft picks
San Jose Earthquakes non-playing staff
Association football midfielders